Phytoecia diademata is a species of beetle in the family Cerambycidae. It was described by Faldermann in 1837. It is known from Iran, Turkey and the Caucasus Mountains.

References

Phytoecia
Beetles described in 1837